Margaret Dale may refer to:
 Margaret Dale (actress) (1876–1972), American stage and film actress
 Margaret Dale (dancer) (1922–2010), British dancer
 Meg Dale (Margaret Dale), a character on the American soap opera Love of Life

See also
Margaret Daly (born 1938), British Conservative Party politician